Bidan may refer to:

 Bidan Community, an Aboriginal community in Western Australia
 Bidan Island, an island off the coast of Yan, Kedah, Malaysia

Iran
 Bidan, Bushehr, a village
 Bidan, Hormozgan, a village
 Bidan, Baft, Kerman, a village
 Bidan, Zarand, Kerman, a village
 Bidan, South Khorasan, a village
 Bidan Sarzeh, Sistan and Baluchestan, a village
 Bidan-e Khvajeh, Kerman, a village
 Bidan-e Panj, Yazd, a village

See also
 Biden (disambiguation)
 Bidin, a surname
 Bidon (disambiguation)